Peter Dinklage is an American actor and producer. Dinklage studied acting at the Bennington College where he starred in a number of amateur stage productions. He made his film debut in the 1995 comedy-drama Living in Oblivion. After appearing in a series of supporting parts in much of the 1990s and early 2000s, he made his breakthrough by starring in the Tom McCarthy-directed comedy-drama The Station Agent (2003), which had him play a railroad-obsessed introvert who inherits an abandoned train depot. He was cast in the role by director Tom McCarthy who recalled fondly his appearance in McCarthy's play The Killing Act (1995). For his performance, he received a Screen Actors Guild Award nomination for Best Actor and an Independent Spirit Awards nomination for Best Male Lead. In the same year, Dinklage played the title role in the play Richard III at The Public Theater. He also played a children's book author in the comedy Elf. In 2006, he appeared in the Sidney Lumet-directed crime film Find Me Guilty. He followed with roles in the films Underdog (2007), the British film Death at a Funeral (2007), with its American remake of the same name (2010) and Trumpkin in the high fantasy film The Chronicles of Narnia: Prince Caspian (2008).

He gained international recognition in 2011 with the HBO fantasy drama series Game of Thrones for his portrayal of Tyrion Lannister. As of 2019, Dinklage has received consecutive Primetime Emmy nominations from 2011 to 2019 including four wins for the role as well as one Golden Globe Award. In 2017, Dinklage became one of the highest paid actors on television and earned £2 million per episode of Game of Thrones.

Dinklage provided the voice of Captain Gutt in the 2012 computer-animated comedy Ice Age: Continental Drift, which earned over $877 million—his highest grossing release until Avengers: Infinity War (2018) which grossed over $2 billion. In 2014, he played supervillain Bolivar Trask in the superhero film X-Men: Days of Future Past. The same year, he voiced Ghost in the video game Destiny, but was later replaced by Nolan North. He then starred in the comedy Pixels (2015), The Boss (2016) and the computer-animated comedy The Angry Birds Movie (2016).

Film

Television

Theater

Video games

See also
 List of awards and nominations received by Peter Dinklage

References

Male actor filmographies
American filmographies